Boss is a manufacturer of effects pedals for electric guitar and bass guitar. It is a division of the Roland Corporation, a Japanese manufacturer that specializes in musical equipment and accessories. For many years Boss has manufactured a wide range of products related to effects processing for guitars, including "compact" and "twin" effects pedals, multi-effect pedals, electronic tuners and pedal boards. In more recent times, Boss expanded their product range by including digital studios, rhythm machines, samplers and other electronic music equipment. They also are now manufacturing solid-state amplifiers and speaker heads such as the Waza and the Katana. Both feature multi-effects units meant to emulate Boss' classic effects pedals.

History

The earliest Boss product was called B-100 The Boss, released in 1974. This came with a clip-on pre-amp and a pickup to amplify acoustic guitars. At this point the Boss company had not been formed and it was still a Beckmen Musical Instruments product (as seen on the B-100 box). The first proper Boss foot pedal effect, the CE-1 Chorus Ensemble, was released June 1976, which was a stand-alone unit of the chorus/vibrato circuit found in the Roland JC-120 amplifier. It was a fairly large, AC-powered unit. Other foot pedals of that year are the GE-10 (a graphic equalizer), the BF-1 (a flanger unit) and the DB-5 (a distortion unit).

Boss's line of compact pedals began in 1977 with the release of six pedals, all of them discontinued: an overdrive pedal (OD-1), a phaser pedal (PH-1), a parametric equalizer called the Spectrum (SP-1),  a 6-band graphic equalizer (GE-6), a compressor pedal (CS-1) and an automatic wah pedal (TW-1). The Boss DS-1 was released the next year, in 1978. Their first compact chorus pedal (CE-2) came in 1979, and their first flanger pedal (BF-2) in 1980. In 1983 Boss released the DD-2 Digital Delay, the first mass-produced digital delay in a compact pedal format. The Metal Zone (MT-2) was released in 1991. In 1992 Boss released nine new pedals, including the Turbo Distortion (DS-2). The Heavy Metal (HM-2) distortion pedal was an integral part of the guitar sound of many styles of heavy metal music ever since. The pedals all share the same 'footprint', for compatibility with pedal boards.

Boss introduced COSM (Composite Object Sound Modeling), Roland's proprietary version of digital modeling technology, into their AC-3 Acoustic Simulator pedal in 2006.  Boss has since released several pedals using COSM, including the FBM-1 '59 Fender Bassman pedal and FDR-1 '65 Fender Deluxe Reverb pedal, introduced at the Winter NAMM show in January 2007.

All Boss compact pedals use a "buffered bypass" type of silent foot switching utilizing Field Effect Transistors (FETs) to avoid clicks and pops. While not "true" bypass, the buffered bypass has the advantage of preventing signal loss due to long runs of cable, while keeping original guitar tone intact.

Japan, Taiwan and Malaysia

Boss compact pedals were originally produced in Japan, until circa 1990 when production moved to Taiwan. Earlier units came with a metal screw securing the battery compartment; later models retained the metal screw, adding a plastic knob for tool-less battery removal. The labels on the bottom of the pedals come in several different colours including black, silver, green, pink and blue. Apart from this the basic external design has remained unchanged for almost half a century.

The DS-1 Distortion circuit design has changed significantly twice throughout its lifetime; the first time was around 1994 when the Toshiba TA7136AP op-amp was replaced with a Rohm BA728N. In 2000 the op-amp was again changed. This time it was replaced with the Mitsubishi M5223AL. The latest op-amp change occurred in 2007, when new DS-1 pedals began shipping with the NJM3404AL op-amp.

In recent years older Boss compact pedals have begun to command a high premium on the used market. Some pedals, such as the relatively rare VB-2 Vibrato, SG-1 Slow Gear, SP-1 Spectrum, DC-2 Dimension C, PS-3 Digital Pitch Shifter/Delay, and either of the two analog delay pedals, the DM-2 and DM-3, are highly sought after by collectors.The Boss Doctor Rhythm DR-110 drum machine was the last drum machine out of Roland to use analog sound synthesis to generate the drum sounds. After the DR-110, all Roland drum machines used samples of drums to produce sounds. The DR-110 is not easily incorporated into a modernized studio setup running MIDI but there are modifications available to sync the DR-110 to other gear. There are also modifications available in DIY formats to add tonal controls to the analog drum sounds on board the DR-110 that will give the user a wider range of sonic ability.

In 2014, Boss released the Japanese-made "Waza-Craft" line of premium pedals, built with higher-end components featuring reissues of highly sought after vintage Boss effects such as the DM-2W Analog Delay, CE-2W Analog Chorus and DC-2W Dimension C. "Waza" means "art" and "technique" in Japanese.

In 2017 Boss released the 500 series pedals as their flagship design, complete with digital display and preset banks, similar to the design of Strymon pedals featuring presets, programmable algorithms and customizable midi options.

In 2019, Boss discontinued the twin format 20 series pedals and replaced the line with the 200 series.

As of 2019 around the launch of the DD3T and DD8 Digital Delays, Boss moved production from Taiwan to Malaysia. The Malaysian black label on the bottom looks similar to the modern era Taiwan label, verifying the new location of manufacturing.

References

Further reading

External links

 BOSS homepage 
 Boss brand homepage archive
 Boss Corporation on Instagram
 Boss Europe on Instagram
 Bosspedals Sweden on Instagram (fan account)

 
Music equipment manufacturers
Guitar effects manufacturing companies
Electronics companies established in 1973
1973 establishments in Japan
Hamamatsu